Marronnier Park (Hangul: 마로니에 공원) is a park in the Daehangno district of Seoul.

Overview

At the center of the park is a horse chestnut (marronnier) tree, of the genus Aesculus, for which the park takes its name. The Marronnier originates from the Mediterranean Sea and is quite common in France and Italy where they grow at roadside. From May to June, red or white flowers bloom. 

The park opened for Seoulites to enjoy artistic culture. It is located in the  former location of Seoul National University. The park is named after the Marronnier growing there.

Culture
Though the park is not very large it forms the center of one of Seoul's major theater districts, Daehangno, and is a popular gathering spot for the city's university students.

Location
Hyehwa-dong (Hangul: 혜화동 Hanja), Jongno-gu, near number 2 Exit Hyehwa Station of

References

External links
Mention of Marronnier Park in an article on Daehangno (Seoul City Government)
Marronnier Park (Jongno-gu official site) 
Photo

Jongno District
Parks in Seoul